Sir Laurence Parsons, 3rd Baronet (1708 – 24 October 1756) was an Anglo-Irish politician.

Parsons was the son of William Parsons and Martha Pigott, and the grandson of Sir William Parsons, 2nd Baronet. His father predeceased his grandfather, and Parsons succeeded to his grandfather's baronetcy on 17 March 1741.

Between 1741 and his death, Parsons sat in the Irish House of Commons as the Member of Parliament for King's County.

He married, firstly, Mary Sprigge, daughter of William Sprigge, on 5 September 1730. He married, secondly, Anne Harman, daughter of Wentworth Harman and Frances Sheppard, on 16 February 1742. His son from his first marriage, William Parsons succeeded to his title in 1756, while a son from his second marriage, Laurence Parsons, was elevated to the peerage as Earl of Rosse in 1806.

References

1708 births
1756 deaths
18th-century Anglo-Irish people
Baronets in the Baronetage of Ireland
Irish MPs 1727–1760
Members of the Parliament of Ireland (pre-1801) for King's County constituencies